Mary Catherine (née Wigginton) Harper (May 13, 1929 – May 9, 2012) was an American educator and politician.

Harper was born in Louisville, Kentucky and lived in Shepherdsville, Kentucky. She graduated from Spalding University and did graduate studies at DePaul University and University of Louisville. She taught school in Bullitt County, Kentucky. Harper served in the Kentucky House of Representatives from 2002 to 2006. Harper died at Jewish Hospital South in Shepherdsville, Kentucky.

Notes

1929 births
2012 deaths
Politicians from Louisville, Kentucky
People from Shepherdsville, Kentucky
DePaul University alumni
University of Louisville alumni
Spalding University alumni
Educators from Kentucky
Kentucky women in education
Women state legislators in Kentucky
Republican Party members of the Kentucky House of Representatives
21st-century American women